Emrys Closs Jones (14 December 1911 – 14 April 1989) was a Welsh cricketer active from 1934 to 1946 who played for Glamorgan. He was born and died in Briton Ferry. He appeared in 101 first-class matches as a righthanded batsman who bowled off breaks. He scored 2,016 runs with a highest score of 132 and took 103 wickets with a best performance of seven for 79.

Notes

1911 births
1989 deaths
Welsh cricketers
Glamorgan cricketers